Dark Water is a 2005 supernatural horror film directed by Walter Salles and written by Rafael Yglesias. It is a remake of the 2002 Japanese film of the same name, which was inspired by the short story "Floating Water" by Koji Suzuki, who also wrote the Ring trilogy. The film stars Jennifer Connelly, John C. Reilly, Pete Postlethwaite, Perla Haney-Jardine, Dougray Scott and Ariel Gade.

Dark Water was released on July 8, 2005, and grossed $44–49 million worldwide. It is a co-production between the United States and Japan.

Plot
Dahlia battles her ex-husband Kyle for custody of their daughter Cecilia, a five-year-old kindergartener. Kyle wants Cecilia to live closer to his apartment in Jersey City, but Dahlia wants to move to the cheaper Roosevelt Island, where she has found a good school.

Dahlia and Cecilia view an apartment in a dilapidated complex on Roosevelt Island, a few blocks from Cecilia's new school. Cecilia sneaks to the roof and finds a Hello Kitty backpack near the building's water tower; the manager, Cory Murray, explains that no one has claimed it. Cecilia initially dislikes the apartment but decides she wants to live there. Dahlia makes an offer the same day.

Shortly after they move in, the bedroom ceiling begins to leak dark water. Dahlia finds the apartment above flooded from every faucet. She finds a family portrait of the former tenants, the Rimsky family: a mother, father, and a girl who is Cecilia's age. Dahlia complains to Murray and the superintendent Veeck about the water, but Veeck insists that he is not a plumber and blames teenage vandals. The ceiling, shoddily patched by Veeck, leaks again. Dahlia is intimidated by teenagers in the apartment, and sees the face of a screaming girl in a washing machine. This isn't helped by a recurring nightmare she has, seeing the girl's mother warning her not to tell the police what she's done to her own daughter or else she will harm Cecilia.

Cecilia's teacher is troubled by Cecilia's "imaginary friend" named Natasha. Cecilia appears to argue with her before losing control of her hand while painting. After Dahlia catches Cecilia playing with dolls and talking to Natasha in the elevator, she forbids Cecilia to talk to Natasha again. In the bathroom, Cecilia passes out as dark water gushes from the toilets and sinks. As Dahlia is busy meeting her lawyer, Jeff Platzer, Kyle takes Cecilia to his apartment. Dahlia feels some form of relief knowing that Kyle will keep her safe.

That night, Dahlia follows footsteps to the roof and sees that water is spilling from the water tower. Inside she finds Natasha's body and calls the police, horrified. Veeck is arrested for negligence as he was aware of her body. This was why he refused to fix the complex's plumbing problems, and he is taken away. Veeck kept claiming that Natasha's parents paid him money to keep quiet about their willful abandonment of their daughter and lie for them that she was with either of them. Dahlia and Platzer discover that Natasha's parents had cruelly abandoned her. In turn, they also conclude that Natasha was left to fend for herself. She fell into the water tower and drowned, leaving her as a vengeful ghost who is jealous of Cecilia because she has Dahlia as her mother.

Dahlia agrees to move closer to Kyle so that shared custody will be easier. As she packs, a girl in a hooded bathrobe who resembles Cecilia asks her to read to her. When Dahlia hears Cecilia playing in the bathtub, she realizes that the girl is Natasha. Natasha begs Dahlia not to leave but Dahlia rushes into the bathroom to save Cecilia. Natasha locks Cecilia in the shower compartment and holds her underwater. Dahlia pleads with Natasha to let her daughter go, promising to be her mother forever. Floods overwhelm the apartment which drowns Dahlia, and Natasha and the ghost of Dahlia walk the hall as mother and daughter.

Three weeks later, Kyle (now given full custody over his daughter following Dahlia's death) and Cecilia pick up the rest of their belongings in Dahlia's apartment. In the elevator, Dahlia's ghost braids Cecilia's hair, telling her she will always be with her. The film ends with Kyle and Cecilia leaving for Kyle's apartment.

Cast
 Jennifer Connelly as Dahlia Williams
 Perla Haney-Jardine as young Dahlia Williams / Natasha Rimsky
 Dougray Scott as Kyle Williams
 John C. Reilly as Cory Murray
 Ariel Gade as Cecilia "Ceci" Williams
 Tim Roth as Jeff Platzer
 Pete Postlethwaite as Mr. Veeck
 Camryn Manheim as Ceci's Teacher

Filming locations
 Roosevelt Island, New York City
 Toronto, Ontario
 Syosset High School in Syosset, New York
 Chandler Valley Center Studios in Panorama City, Los Angeles

Reception

Box office
Dark Water played in 2,657 theaters with a complete average run of 3.2 weeks. The film made $10 million, which is 39.0% of the movie's total gross, on its opening weekend. It went on to make $25.5 million in the US and between $18.9 million and $24 million in the international box office, adding up to a worldwide box office total of $44.4 to $49.5 million.

Critical response
Dark Water holds a 47% approval rating at Rotten Tomatoes based on 154 reviews and an average score of 5.54/10. The site's critics' consensus reads: "All the atmospherics in Dark Water can't make up for the lack of genuine scares."

William Thomas described the film in Empire as "interesting and unsettling, but never terrifying. Best viewed as a family drama-come-Tale Of The Unexpected rather than a full-on horror". For Rolling Stone, Peter Travers wrote, "A classy ghost story is just the ticket in a summer of crass jolts... Screenwriter Rafael Yglesias (Fearless) stays alert to the psychological fears that underpin the supernatural doings in the apartment upstairs. Connelly digs deep into the role of a woman with issues of abandonment and rage that slowly reveal their roots. In a movie with more subtext than Rosemary’s Baby, nearly everyone, including Tim Roth as Dahlia’s lawyer, harbors secrets. Salles unleashes a torrent of suspense for one purpose: to plumb the violence of the mind."

Todd McCarthy of Variety called it "well-crafted but thoroughly unsuspenseful" and said it "is dripping with clammy, claustrophobic atmosphere, but ultimately reveals itself as just another mildewed, child-centric ghost story of little import or resonance." From The Washington Post, Ann Hornaday described the film as a "tasteful but unremitting bummer and yet one more case of an Oscar-winning actress proving that she can still do the kinds of disposable movies big awards are supposedly meant to banish from your résume forever." For Slant Magazine Nick Schager wrote that the film improves on the source material characterizations, while over explaining the supernatural events. He concluded by saying, "this slick adaptation is also a moldy, third-generation retread of The Ring."

Accolades

Fangoria Chainsaw Awards
 Best Actress: Jennifer Connelly (nominee)
 Best Supporting Actor: John C. Reilly (nominee)
 Best Screenplay: Rafael Yglesias (nominee)
 Best Score: Angelo Badalamenti (nominee)

Teen Choice Awards
 Choice Summer Movie (nominee)

Home media

Dark Water is available on DVD, in two releases. One release is in pan and scan full screen and includes the theatrical cut, which is PG-13 and runs 105 minutes. The other is in widescreen (aspect ratio 2.35:1) and includes an unrated cut, which is actually shorter than the theatrical cut and runs at 103 minutes. Note that exact specifications vary by DVD region. There is also a PlayStation Portable UMD video version of the film. A Blu-ray Disc was released on October 17, 2006, but it only contains the widescreen PG-13 theatrical version and fewer extras than the DVD releases.

Soundtrack
 Soundtrack music by Angelo Badalamenti
 "I Got Soul" Written by John Martinez and Josh Kessler Performed by Scar featuring Filthy Rich Courtesy of Marc Ferrari/MasterSource
 "Electrified" Written by Mike Gallagher and Marc Ferrari Performed by Mike Gallagher Courtesy of Marc Ferrari/MasterSource
 "Itsy Bitsy Spider" (uncredited) Written by Traditional
 "Namidaga Afuretemo" (Japanese Theme Song) Performed by Crystal Kay

See also

 List of ghost films

References

External links

 
 
 
 

2005 films
2005 horror films
2005 psychological thriller films
Films about psychic powers
Films about telekinesis
2000s ghost films
Touchstone Pictures films
American haunted house films
Films based on short fiction
American psychological horror films
American psychological drama films
American supernatural thriller films
Horror film remakes
Films directed by Walter Salles
Films set in the 1970s
Films set in the 2000s
Films set in 2005
Films set in apartment buildings
Films set in New York City
American ghost films
Roosevelt Island
Films scored by Angelo Badalamenti
American remakes of Japanese films
Films based on adaptations
Asian-American horror films
Films produced by Roy Lee
Vertigo Entertainment films
2000s English-language films
2000s American films